James Shanes (born 17 March 1997) is a British speedway rider and also competes in Grasstrack and Longtrack speedway. He is a four times British Masters Grasstrack Champion, 2 times European Grasstrack Champion and world long track competitor.

Longtrack
World Championship Grand-Prix Series

Best Results
  Eenrum First 2017, Third 2018.
  La Reole Third 2017

World Championship Team Championship
 2015 -  Muhldorf (with Andrew Appleton, Richard Hall & Glen Phillips) First
 2016 -  Marianske Lazne (with Andrew Appleton, Richard Hall & Glen Phillips) Fourth
 2017 -  Roden 23/36 (with (with Andrew Appleton, Richard Hall & Edward Kennett) sixth
 2018 -  Morizes 5/46pts (with Adam Ellis, Zach Wajtknecht & Chris Harris) Second

Grasstrack
Shanes began racing in 2003, aged 6 years, on a 50cc automatic. He progressed through the youth classes with some success, including British Championship wins in 2010 and 2011. He upgraded to adult 250cc racing on his 15th birthday and finished 3rd place in the 250cc British Championship that year.

Shanes is the first rider to complete a hat-trick of British Masters Grasstrack titles as well as being the youngest to win back to back titles. He is also the youngest European Champion.

European Championship
 2015  Staphorst (Second) 18pts
 2016  Folkestone (Champion) 9pts
 2017  Hertingen (Champion) 20pts
 2018  Tayac (Fourth) 15pts

British Masters
 2014  Folkestone (4th)
 2015  Wimborne (Champion)
 2016  Bristol (Champion)
 2017  Folkestone (Champion)
 2018  Gawsworth (Second)

Speedway
In 2023, he signed for Redcar Bears for the SGB Championship 2023 but because of complications over an arm injury he was uanble to compete for the Bears.

All figures relate to the League Racing.

External References
 Official Website
 GrasstrackGB
 British Speedway A-Z
 pro-boards

References

British speedway riders
1997 births
Living people
Individual Speedway Long Track World Championship riders
Birmingham Brummies riders
Poole Pirates riders
Redcar Bears riders
Sheffield Tigers riders
Somerset Rebels riders
Swindon Robins riders